Sandy Johnson (born July 7, 1954) is an American model and actress. She was Playboy magazine's Playmate of the Month for the June 1974 issue. Her centerfold was photographed by Mario Casilli. (A cropped image from this centerfold was used as a top-sheet graphic for the Burton Love 52 snowboard in 2008).

Johnson was born into a family that included four older sisters in San Antonio, Texas. She attended Santa Monica Community College, then proceeded to obtain her Master's degree and Ph.D degree in Texas. After she appeared in Playboy Johnson went into acting. Her credits include Halloween (1978) as Judith Myers, the sister and first victim of murderer Michael Myers, Gas Pump Girls (1979) and H.O.T.S. (1979), alongside fellow Playmate Pamela Jean Bryant and eventual Playboy model K.C. Winkler.

Johnson attended the 40th Anniversary convention for the Halloween franchise in Pasadena, California, from October 12–14, 2018.

Filmography
 Surfer Girls (1978)
 Jokes My Folks Never Told Me (1978) – Various roles
 Halloween (1978) – Judith Myers
 H.O.T.S. (1979) – Stephanie
 Gas Pump Girls (1979) – April
 Terror in the Aisles (1984) – Judith Myers (archive footage)
 Halloween (2018) – Judith Myers (stock footage)

See also
 List of people in Playboy 1970–1979

References

External links
 
 

1954 births
1970s Playboy Playmates
American film actresses
Living people
People from San Antonio
21st-century American women